Morgan's Gate is a locality in Mangalore city of Karnataka state in India. It is situated around 4 km southeast to Hampankatta. It is known for the Basel Mission tile factory, founded in 1865. It is close to Mangaladevi Temple in Bolar. Mangalore Club, Mphasis and St. Rita's Church are the other landmarks in the area.

Banks 
 Canara bank

References

Localities in Mangalore